Brent Naden (born 30 December 1995) is an Indigenous Australian professional rugby league footballer who plays as a  and er for the Wests Tigers in the NRL.

Naden previously played for the Canterbury-Bankstown Bulldogs, and the Penrith Panthers with whom was part of the 2021 NRL Grand Final win as 18th man.

Background
Naden was born in Wellington, New South Wales, and is of Indigenous Australian  (Wiradjuri) and German descent. He was educated at Wellington High School.

Naden played his junior rugby league for the Wellington Cowboys, before being signed by the Penrith Panthers.

Playing career

Early years
From 2014 to 2015, Naden played for the Penrith Panthers' NRL Under-20s team, captaining the side to a premiership and being named on the interchange bench in the NYC Team of the Year in 2015.

In 2016, Naden graduated to their Intrust Super Premiership NSW team. 

In 2017, Naden joined the Canberra Raiders but failed to make an NRL appearance, only appearing in their ISP NSW team Mount Pritchard Mounties.

In 2018, Naden joined the Newcastle Knights on a 1-year contract, but again failed to make an NRL appearance.

2019
In 2019, Naden rejoined the Panthers. In round 12 of the 2019 NRL season, Naden made his NRL debut for the Panthers against the Manly Warringah Sea Eagles.

In round 15 against the New Zealand Warriors, Naden scored 2 tries, one of which was an 80 metre effort as he beat several New Zealand players to reach the try line. Penrith would go on to win the match in extra time 19-18.

In Round 18 against St George, Naden scored two tries as Penrith won the match 40-18 at Penrith Stadium.

2020
In round 20 of the 2020 NRL season, Naden scored two tries in a 42-0 victory over Canterbury-Bankstown at ANZ Stadium.  Penrith finished the regular season having already claimed the Minor Premiership at week earlier.

Naden played 19 games for Penrith in the 2020 NRL season scoring 12 tries.  He played in the 2020 NRL Grand Final where Penrith lost to Melbourne 26-20.

2021 
On April 28, 2021, it was announced that Naden had signed a two-year deal with Canterbury-Bankstown starting in 2022.

In round 22, Naden scored two tries for Penrith in a 34-16 victory over St. George Illawarra.

2022
In round 1 of the 2022 NRL season, Naden made his club debut for Canterbury in their 6-4 victory against North Queensland at the Queensland Country Bank Stadium.
On 17 May after Trent Barrett stood down as coach of the Canterbury-Bankstown Bulldogs, Naden was signed by the West Tigers effective immediately.
Naden made his club debut the same week for the Wests Tigers in their 36-22 victory against his former club Canterbury at Leichhardt Oval.
In round 14, Naden was sent off for a dangerous lifting tackle in Wests 30-4 loss against Manly.
Naden played a total of ten games for the Wests Tigers in the 2022 NRL season as the club finished bottom of the table and claimed the Wooden Spoon for the first time.

Personal life
Naden is distantly related to Malcolm Naden.

In November 2020, Naden entered a rehabilitation clinic in Sydney.  The Penrith club released a statement which said "Following the 2020 NRL grand final, Brent Naden approached the club and disclosed a number of personal issues he wished to address.  As a result, Brent is currently undertaking a voluntary rehabilitation program in a private Sydney facility".

On 1 December 2020, Naden was provisionally suspended by the NRL after testing positive for Cocaine. The NRL released a statement which read “The National Rugby League (NRL) has today provisionally suspended Penrith Panthers player Brent Naden under the NRL's Anti-Doping Policy.

“The mandatory Provisional Suspension Notice asserts that Mr Naden returned a positive A-sample for metabolites of cocaine following a test conducted by Sport Integrity Australia after the Grand Final match on 25 October 2020. Cocaine is prohibited In-Competition by the World Anti-Doping Agency (WADA) and the NRL's Anti-Doping Policy".

References

External links
Penrith Panthers profile

1995 births
Living people
Australian rugby league players
Australian people of German descent
Canterbury-Bankstown Bulldogs players
Indigenous Australian rugby league players
Penrith Panthers players
Mount Pritchard Mounties players
Rugby league centres
Rugby league players from New South Wales
Wests Tigers players
Wiradjuri people